The Contractual Remedies Act 1979 was a statute of the New Zealand Parliament. It provided remedies in respect of misrepresentation, repudiation or breach of contract in New Zealand. It was repealed by the Contract and Commercial Law Act 2017.

External links 
Contractual Remedies Act 1979 on New Zealand Legislation
Statutes of New Zealand
1979 in New Zealand law
New Zealand contract law
Repealed New Zealand legislation